A criminal is a person who commits a crime.

Criminal or The Criminal may also refer to:

Film and television
 The Criminal (1916 film), an American film of 1916
 The Criminal (1926 film), a French silent film
 The Criminal (1960 film), a British film
 Criminal, a 1994 British television film in the Screen Two anthology series
 Criminal (1995 film), a Telugu and Hindi film starring Nagarjuna, directed by Mahesh Bhatt
 The Criminal (1999 film), a British film
 Criminal (2004 film), an American film starring John C. Reilly based upon the Argentine film Nine Queens
 Criminal (2005 film), a 2005 Bengali film
 Criminal (2016 film), an American film starring Kevin Costner
 Criminal (TV series), a 2019 pan-European crime anthology series, consisting of separate sub-series 
Criminal: UK
Criminal: France
Criminal: Spain
Criminal: Germany

Music
 Criminal (band), a Chilean-English thrash/death metal group
 Criminal (album), a 2018 album by the Soft Moon

Songs
 "Criminal" (Britney Spears song), 2011
 "Criminal" (Fiona Apple song), 1997
 "Criminal" (Lindsay Ell song), 2017
 "Criminal" (Natti Natasha and Ozuna song), 2017
 "Criminal", by Disturbed from Indestructible
 "Criminal", by Eminem from The Marshall Mathers LP
 "Criminal", by Gwen Stefani, an unreleased song
 "Criminal", by Lower Than Atlantis from Changing Tune
 "Criminal", by Manafest from The Moment
 "Criminal", by Miguel from War & Leisure
 "Criminal", from the Ra.One film soundtrack
 "Criminal", by Taemin from Never Gonna Dance Again (album)

Other uses
 Criminal (comics), a crime comic book by writer Ed Brubaker and artist Sean Phillips
 Criminal (podcast), podcast on true crime, hosted by Phoebe Judge
 The Criminal (novel), a 1953 novel by Jim Thompson
 The Criminal (Havelock Ellis), a 1890 book by Havelock Ellis

See also
 Convict
 Parolee
 Prisoner
 Ex-convict
 Criminal law, the body of statutory and common law that deals with crime and the legal punishment of criminal offences
 Criminals (disambiguation)  
 Crime (disambiguation)
 Criminal Mind (disambiguation)
 Convict (disambiguation)
 Prisoner (disambiguation)